The 2013 Trophée Éric Bompard was the fifth event of six in the 2013–14 ISU Grand Prix of Figure Skating, a senior-level international invitational competition series. It was held at the Palais Omnisports de Paris Bercy in Paris on November 15–17. Medals were awarded in the disciplines of men's singles, ladies' singles, pair skating, and ice dancing. Skaters earned points toward qualifying for the 2013–14 Grand Prix Final.

Eligibility
Skaters who reached the age of 14 by July 1, 2013 were eligible to compete on the senior Grand Prix circuit.

Entries
The entries were as follows.

In the men's event, Romain Ponsart withdrew and was replaced by Alexander Majorov. Chafik Besseghier withdrew and was not replaced. Ross Miner withdrew due to an ankle sprain and was not replaced.

In the ladies' event, Yuna Kim withdrew due to an injury. Kiira Korpi also withdrew. They were replaced by Amelie Lacoste and Natalia Popova. Lenaelle Gilleron-Gorry withdrew and was not replaced.

In the pairs' event, Daria Popova / Bruno Massot withdrew and were replaced by Annabelle Prolss / Ruben Blommaert.

Results

Men

Ladies

Pairs

Ice dancing

References

External links

 Entries
 Detailed results

Trophée Éric Bompard, 2013
Internationaux de France
Figure
Figure skating in Paris
International figure skating competitions hosted by France
November 2013 sports events in France